Leptorhoptrum is a monotypic genus of dwarf spiders containing the single species, Leptorhoptrum robustum. It was first described by C. Chyzer & Władysław Kulczyński in 1894, and has only been found in Japan, and Russia.

See also
 List of Linyphiidae species (I–P)

References

Holarctic spiders
Linyphiidae
Monotypic Araneomorphae genera